The genus Bacterium was a taxon described in 1828 by Christian Gottfried Ehrenberg. The type species was later changed from Bacterium triloculare to Bacterium coli (now Escherichia coli) as it was lost. In 1951 and then in 1954 it was recognised as a nomen generum rejiciendum, which means a generic name to be rejected; this also applied to its family Bacteriaceae.

This genus included non-spore forming rods whose relation to other species was obscure (a "taxonomy dumping group"). This is different from the genus Bacillus, whose members were spore forming rods (sensu Cohn 1872).

Species
Many species were placed under the genus. Given that the genus was abolished in the process of forming the Bacteriological Code there is no such thing as an official list of species present. These are those accepted by Breed and Conn in 1935:
 Bacterium tumefaciens, now Agrobacterium radiobacter
 Bacterium aerogenes, now Klebsiella aerogenes
 Bacterium  violaceum, now Chromobacterium violaceum
 Bacterium amylovorum, now Erwinia amylovora
 Bacterium zopfii, now Kurthia zopfii
 Bacterium monocytogenes, now Listeria monocytogenes
 Bacterium pneumoniae, now Klebsiella pneumoniae

See also
 Bacteria
 Bacterial taxonomy

References

Obsolete bacteria taxa
Taxa named by Christian Gottfried Ehrenberg